A by-thirds Hyndburn Borough Council local election, was held on Thursday 5 May 2022. Approximately one third of the local council's 35 seats fell up for election on that day.

Background 
Before the election Labour had a majority of 15 councillors, Conservatives had 12 councillors, with 6 Independent councillors and 2-vacant (following Chris Knight's  (Lab-St. Oswalds) March-23rd announcement that he has stood down as a councillor with immediate effect, despite not being up for re-election until May next year, in addition to the announcement (March-24th) that Leader of Hyndburn Council, Miles Parkinson, resigned from the Labour Party and will now be an Independent councillor for Altham ward, until May-2023 and after Labour Councillor Eamonn Higgins announced (March-31st) that he would be quitting Labour, to serve Huncoat as an Independent for the remainder of his term, until May-2023.

In this election, Labour will be defending 6-ward-seats with Conservatives defending 4-ward-seats.  In 2018, Overton was won by Labour's Jennifer MOLINEUX, who later left the Party to become an Independent councillor, but she is standing down in this election.  In 2019, St Oswald's was won by Labour's Chris KNIGHT, who recently stood down as a councillor leaving his vacant-seat open to a by-election.  Former Labour candidate Shahed MAHMOOD also quit Labour last year and is standing for the Conservatives in Milnshaw ward.

Local Election result 
After the election, the composition of the council's 35 seats was -

 Labour 17
 Conservative 14
 Independent 3
 Vacant 1

NB: Five (of the 16) Council wards, where seats were NOT up for re-election in 2022, included the following wards - Altham, Baxenden and Church, plus Barnfield and Central in Accrington

Previous Councillors who were Standing-Down in this election included - Bernadette Parkinson (Ind-Netherton), David Parkins (Lab-Huncoat), Diane Fielding (Lab-Spring Hill) and Jenny Molineux (Ind-Overton).

Additionally, following Chris Knight's (Lab-St. Oswalds) recent and sudden decision to stand-down from the seat he won in 2019, that seat will ALSO be up for a by-election this year - with the winner serving out the remaining 12-months, until THAT same seat comes up for re-election to a full-4-year term from 2023.  

Retiring Netherton councillor Bernadette Parkinson announced[April-11th] that she has resigned from the Labour Party after 27 years, in the wake of her husband and council leader Cllr Miles Parkinson, who also quit the party. Another retiring councillor, Spring Hill's Diane Fielding announced[April-19th] that she has also resigned from the Labour Party.  Former Overton Labour councillor Michael Hindley announced[April-20th] that he has resigned from the Labour Party, leaving that seat vacant, after being recently cautioned by the police over an assault during a previous council meeting.  This leaves the Hyndburn Labour Party with only 15-sitting councillors (less than the 18 needed for Overall Control), ahead of the upcoming May-election.

In the months following this election, veteran Labour politician Joyce Plummer, who took a post in Hyndburn Borough Council’s new cabinet, was suspended from the party group[June-29th] and faces further disciplinary action by the party which could lead to her expulsion, ahead of the Overton by-election, called for Thursday July 14. And also, some months later, former Church Labour councillor Loraine Cox announced[August-24th] that she has resigned from the Labour Party, to join the growing Independent group of councillors, before eventually joining the Hyndburn Conservative group[September-5th].  This leaves the Hyndburn Labour Party with only 13-sitting councillors, compared to 2019 when they had 26 councillors on Hyndburn Borough Council.

Ward Results

Clayton-le-Moors

Huncoat

Immanuel

Milnshaw

Netherton

Overton

Peel

Rishton

Spring Hill

St Andrew's

St Oswald's 
 two-seats ... the winner of Chris'-2019 seat (*), will be up for re-election in May-2023, just 12-months later.

References

External links
Hyndburn Borough Council - Elections
Hyndburn Borough Council - 2022 Notice of Election
Electoral Commission - May 2022 elections guide
LCC Elections, Latest News - Local Elections 2022
Hyndburn Borough Council - 2022 Statement of Persons Nominated
Lancashire Telegraph - Live updates from Local Election results
HYNDBURN BC 2022 BOROUGH RESULTS

Hyndburn Borough Council elections
Hyndburn